John Somerville (10 September 1926 – 5 March 1987) was a New Zealand lawn bowls player.

Bowls career
At the 1974 British Commonwealth Games, Somerville won the men's fours gold medal partnering David Baldwin, Kerry Clark and Gordon Jolly.

A member of the Rewa Bowling Club, Somerville won the 1971, 1985 and 1986 fours title at the New Zealand National Bowls Championships.

Awards
In 2013, Somerville was an inaugural inductee into the Bowls New Zealand Hall of Fame.

References

1926 births
1987 deaths
New Zealand male bowls players
Commonwealth Games gold medallists for New Zealand
Bowls players at the 1974 British Commonwealth Games
Commonwealth Games medallists in lawn bowls
20th-century New Zealand people
Medallists at the 1974 British Commonwealth Games